A sociable (short for sociable coach) or barouche-sociable is an open, four-wheeled carriage described as a cross between a barouche and a victoria, having two double seats facing each other. It might be controlled from the interior by an owner-driver or have a box for a coachman. A pair of folding hoods protect the passengers. The carriage is drawn by either a single horse in shafts or a matching pair in pole gear.

The Balmoral Sociable is a carriage of the Royal Mews (so named because its interior is lined with Balmoral tartan); it is still used on occasion.

See also
Barouche

References

External links
 Seabrook Coaching Stable Dispersal Auction: Sociable or Double Victoria Carriage Association of America (official site); illustrated.

Sources 
 Discovering Horse-drawn Vehicles, D. J. Smith, Shire Publications 1994

Carriages